Odo Dobrowolski (born 1883 in Chernivtsi, died 1917 in Kiev) was a Polish painter.

Life
He was the son of Józef Dobrowolski, an official of the Gubernium of Galicia, and Eugenia Wittich. Odo took his secondary education in Lviv. He studied at the Jan Matejko Academy of Fine Arts in Kraków, most likely as an independent student. During his years in Paris, between 1908 and 1909, he was guided by Jan Styka. Afterwards, he took a short stay in Munich, continuing onto Lviv then on. In Lviv, he created a large oil painting, illustrating the town square, put on display at Gabriela Zapolska's confectionary "Dworek" by 4 Akademicka Street. In the years of 1911–12, he returned to live in Paris. In 1912, he took part in a presentation of drawings at the Leopolitan Literature-Art Grouping. During the Russian army's occupation of Lviv, Odo, with the affirmation of the military's local censorship council, published his ten-piece portfolio of an auto lithography of "Lwów 1914-15" ("Lviv 1914-15", costing 30 crowns), which received much popularity. In June 1915, he moved to Russia.

Gallery

See also
List of Polish painters

References

External links

1883 births
1917 deaths
19th-century Polish painters
19th-century Polish male artists
20th-century Polish painters
20th-century Polish male artists
Polish male painters
Painters from the Russian Empire